Daffodil is the common name for the plant genus Narcissus and any of its individual species.

Daffodil, Daffodils,  The Daffodils, etc. may refer to:

Art, entertainment, and media
 Daffodils (film), a 2019 film set in New Zealand
 Daffodil, a rabbit on US children's TV series Clifford's Puppy Days
Doctor Daffodil, character in the US animated series Pet Alien
 "Daffodils" (poem), alternative title for Wordsworth's "I Wandered Lonely as a Cloud"
Daffodil Records (Canadian label)
 Daffodil Records, American record label
 Daffodils (song), a song by Mark Ronson

Educational institutions
Daffodil International University, a private university in Dhaka, Bangladesh
Daffodils Public School, a school in Motihari, Bihar, India

Events
 Daffodil Day, a fundraising event used by various cancer charities, including Marie Curie Cancer Care
 The Daffodil Festival, regional festival and parade held in Pierce County, Washington, USA

Ships
HMS Daffodil (1940), British train ferry used by navy in World War II
MV Royal Daffodil (1939), British passenger ship
SS Royal Daffodil (built 1906, formerly SS Daffodil), a Mersey Ferry that took part in the Zeebrugge Raid
USS Daffodil (1862), US navy sidewheel steamer

Other uses
Narcissus pseudonarcissus, the wild daffodil (Lent lily)
 DAF Daffodil, a Dutch automobile of the 1960s
Daffodil or "daffy", a derogatory slang term for a homosexual or cross-dresser

See also

 Daffydils, a comic strip by Tad Dorgan